An electromagnetic catapult, also called EMALS ("electromagnetic aircraft launch system") after the specific US system, is a type of aircraft launching system. Currently, only the United States and China have successfully developed it, and it is installed on the Gerald R. Ford-class aircraft carriers and the Chinese aircraft carrier Fujian. The system launches carrier-based aircraft by means of a catapult employing a linear induction motor rather than the conventional steam piston. The advantage of the electromagnetic catapult is that it is safer and more reliable because the acceleration process is more uniform and less damaging to the structure of the aircraft compared to the steam catapult.

Its main advantage is that it accelerates aircraft more smoothly, putting less stress on their airframes. Compared to steam catapults, the EMALS also weighs less, is expected to cost less and require less maintenance, and can launch both heavier and lighter aircraft than a steam piston-driven system. It also reduces the carrier's requirement for fresh water, thus reducing the demand for energy-intensive desalination.

History
Developed in the 1950s, steam catapults have proven exceptionally reliable. Carriers equipped with four steam catapults have been able to use at least one of them at 99.5% of the time. However, several drawbacks. One group of Navy engineers wrote: "The foremost deficiency is that the catapult operates without feedback control. With no feedback, there often occurs large transients in tow forces that can damage or reduce the life of the airframe." The steam system is massive, inefficient (4–6%), and hard to control. These control problems allow  steam-powered catapults to launch heavy aircraft, but not aircraft as light as many unmanned aerial vehicles.

General Atomics Electromagnetic Systems (GA-EMS) developed the first operational modern electromagnetic catapult, named Electromagnetic Aircraft Launch System (EMALS), for the United States Navy. The system was installed on USS Gerald R. Ford aircraft carrier, replacing traditional steam catapults. This innovation eliminates the traditional requirement to generate and store steam, freeing up considerable area below deck. With the EMALS, Gerald R. Ford can accomplish 25% more aircraft launches per day than the Nimitz class and requires 25% fewer crew members. The EMALS uses a linear induction motor (LIM), which uses alternating current (AC) to generate magnetic fields that propel a carriage along a track to launch the aircraft. A system somewhat similar to EMALS, Westinghouse's electropult, was developed in 1946 but not deployed.

China developed an electromagnetic catapult system in the 2000s for aircraft carriers, but with a different technical approach. Chinese adopted a medium-voltage, direct current (DC) power transmission system, instead of the alternating current catapult system that United States developed.

Systems under development
The concept of a ground carriage is intended for civilian use and takes the idea of an electromagnetic aircraft launch system one step further, with the entire landing gear remaining on the runway for both takeoff and landing.

China
Rear Admiral Yin Zhuo of the Chinese Navy has said that China's next aircraft carrier will also have an electromagnetic aircraft launch system. Multiple prototypes have been spotted by the media in 2012, and aircraft capable of electromagnetic launching are undergoing testing at a Chinese Navy research facility.

According to a report in July 2017, the construction of the Type 003 aircraft carrier has been rescheduled in order to choose between a steam or electromagnetic catapult and the latest competition results shows that the electromagnetic launchers will be used in the Type 003 aircraft carrier.

China's military chief claims a breakthrough in electromagnetic launch systems for aircraft carriers has been made, and will utilize such a system in the third aircraft carrier that China will build after Type 002. The launch system is powered by fossil fuel via generators and capacitors. The design on the Type 003 carrier is being led by Rear Admiral Ma Weiming.

China's electromagnetic catapult has been installed on its third aircraft carrier, the aircraft carrier Fujian.

Russia
Russia's United Shipbuilding Corporation (USC) is developing new launch systems for warplanes based on aircraft carriers, USC President Alexei Rakhmanov told TASS on 4 July 2018.

United States
A proposal to retrofit it into  carriers was rejected. John Schank said: "The biggest problems facing the Nimitz class are the limited electrical power generation capability and the upgrade-driven increase in ship weight and erosion of the center-of-gravity margin needed to maintain ship stability."

Ships with electromagnetic catapult

United States
Gerald R. Ford-class aircraft carrier (in service)

China
Chinese aircraft carrier Fujian (outfitting)

Type 076 landing helicopter dock (planned)

Type 004 aircraft carrier (planned)

France
Future French aircraft carrier (planned)

Russia
Project 23000E (proposed)

See also
Coilgun
Railgun
Mass driver
Modern United States Navy carrier air operations
Naval aviation

References

External links
"Electromagnetic Aircraft Launch System – EMALS", GlobalSecurity.org
"Electropult"
The electromagnetic rail aircraft launch system, Pt 1: Objectives and principles EEWorldonline.com
The electromagnetic rail aircraft launch system, Pt 2: Implementation and issues EEWorldonline.com

Aircraft carriers
Electromagnetic components
Linear induction motors
Naval aviation technology